The State Committee for National Security (ГКНБ) is the national agency responsible for intelligence on counter terrorism and organised crime in Kyrgyzstan. In carrying out this task, it carries out both preventive and investigative measures against organized terrorism and crime. The chairman of the UKMK is a military officer and a member of the Security Council of Kyrgyzstan. It is currently based on 70 Erkindik Street, Bishkek.

Official tasks 
The activities of the UKMK include:

 Conducting counterintelligence 
 Gathering intelligence (usually against terrorist groups and drug traffickers)
 Securing information 
 Suppress the activities of harmful organizations
 Uncovering espionage and corrupt activities
 Extraction and deliver secret information related to organized criminal and terrorist groups
 Carry out the protection of the state border
 Carry out the protection of economic and legal interests in Kyrgyzstan
 Encrypted communication systems for government institutions

History 
The history of the modern Kyrgyz intelligence services dates back to December 1917, when the All-Russian Emergency Commission (VChK) was formed. A year later, on the Pishpek district investigation commission was established. After national delimitation occurred in the early 1920s, Regional State Political Directorate of the Kara-Kyrgyz Autonomous Oblast was created. Later on the Committee for State Security (KGB) of the Kyrgyz SSR was formed, which served as the republican affiliate for the national KGB agency. On 20 November 1991, President Askar Akayev signed a presidential decree establishing the UKMK. Since 2007, the State Committee for National Security has been operating in its current form.

In August 2002, the State Border Guard Service was established as a part of the UKMK, having been merged with the Main Border Guard Directorate of the Ministry of Defense and the Main Directorate of Border Control of the UKMK that day. This was done to have a more centralised intelligence system in Kyrgyzstan. In the years that followed, the UKMK would have little influence on the border guard service until it was finally removed from the National Security Committee on 4 September 2012, it was and was re-established as an independent department in the government.

Special Forces 
The UKMK controls the Alpha anti-terrorist unit, which like all former Soviet countries refers to a top-secret special forces unit. The unit helps deliver on the tasks listed above. In August 2010, fighters of the unit went on strike in protest against the arrest of their former chief Almaz Dzholdoshaliyev. They appealed to President Roza Otunbayeva with a demand to change the measure of restraint for the detained UKMK officers. In response, the Prosecutor General's Office opened criminal cases against nine employees of the unit, accusing them of shooting at demonstrators during the Kyrgyz Revolution of 2010.

Criticisms

Political repression 
Following his party's success in the 2010 Kyrgyz parliamentary election, on 23 October, the home of Kamchybek Tashiev was burglarized. He later stated to Al Jazeera that "they broke in like bandits" and "tried to eliminate me", adding that "for sure, GSNB [security services] was behind these actions." Tashiev later became Chairman of the UKMK.

Chairman 

 Idris Kadyrkulov (20 April 2018 – 15 May 2019)
 Orozbek Opumbayev (June 2019 – 9 October 2020)
 Kamchybek Tashiev (since 16 October 2020)

Awards 
Since its establishment, the UKMK has sported many commemorative awards such as the following:

 Breastplate "70 years of the Chief Directorate of the National Security Committee of the Kyrgyz Republic in the city of Bishkek"
 Breastplate "Mildet" to order
 Medal "100 years of Kyrgyz security services"

Related security services in foreign countries 
  – Federal Security Service of the Russian Federation
  – Federal Bureau of Investigation
  – Shin Bet
  – Security Service of Ukraine
  – State Security Committee of the Republic of Belarus
  – National Security Committee of the Republic of Kazakhstan
  – General Directorate for Internal Security and Directorate-General for External Security

See also 
 Law enforcement in Kyrgyzstan
 Ministry of Internal Affairs
 Armed Forces of Kyrgyzstan
 Ministry of Emergency Situations (Kyrgyzstan)
 List of intelligence agencies
 Alpha Group

References

External links 
Official site of the GKNB 

Military of Kyrgyzstan
Intelligence agencies
Secret police
Government of Kyrgyzstan
Law enforcement in Kyrgyzstan